Ganga Sharan Singh Award (Devnagari: गंगाशरण सिंह पुरस्कार) is a literary honour in India which Kendriya Hindi Sansthan, (Central Hindi Organization), Ministry of Human Resource Development, annually confers on writers of outstanding works in Hindi Literature. It is also a Hindi Sevi Samman and is given to number of Hindi experts for playing their important role in promoting the Hindi language.

History
The award was established by Kendriya Hindi Sansthan in 1989 on the name of the Great Hindi Linguist & Freedom Fighter Ganga Sharan Singh. It was first awarded in 1989.

References 

Indian literary awards
Awards established in 1989